In game theory an evolutionarily stable set (ES set), sometimes referred to as evolutionary stable sets, is a set of strategies, which score equally against each other, each of which would be an evolutionarily stable strategy (ESS) were it not for the other members of the set.  ES sets were first defined by Thomas (1985ab).

References

Further reading
 Balkenborg, D. & Schlag, K. H. (2001) Evolutionarily stable sets. International Journal of Game Theory 29:571-595.
 Thomas, B. (1985a) On evolutionarily stable sets. Journal of Mathematical Biology 22:105—115.
 Thomas, B. (1985b) Evolutionary stable sets in mixed-strategist models. Theoretical Population Biology 28:332-341.

Evolutionary game theory